Waisea Nayacalevu Vuidravuwalu (born 26 June 1990) is a Fijian rugby union footballer. He plays wing for Fiji and Toulon in the Top 14 .

Career
Waisea, along with his brother, Avenisi Vasuinubu both played for Melbourne Rugby in the Victoria Rugby Championships. The brothers decided to join the Uprising team in the Uprising 7's tournament held in Fiji in 2012. They played so well that both brothers were selected to join the Fiji 7's team for the 2011–12 IRB Sevens World Series. Waisea was one of the stand-out performers that season scoring 25 tries that season equal with another rising star, Metuisela Talebula. He was selected in the Fiji 15's team for the 2012 IRB Pacific Nations Cup. He made his debut for Fiji against Japan on the right wing and scored a try as well. He scored a try against Scotland two weeks later. He was signed on by French side Stade Français after his performance in the PNC and he made his debut against Montpellier in August 2012. He has played 18 games since joining the side scoring 7 tries. In May 2013, he returned to Fiji to try to win his place back to represent the Fiji 7's team at the 2013 Rugby World Cup Sevens.

Since 2021, he has been sharing the captaincy duties for the Flying Fijians with Levani Botia and Semi Radradra being one of the most experienced and standout players in the team.

References

External links
 

1990 births
Living people
Fijian rugby union players
Fiji international rugby union players
Fijian expatriate rugby union players
Expatriate rugby union players in France
Rugby union centres
Rugby union wings
Fijian expatriate sportspeople in France
Stade Français players
RC Toulonnais players
People from Navua
I-Taukei Fijian people